Maria Kikuchi (born 5 December 2001) is a Japanese professional footballer who plays as a midfielder for WE League club INAC Kobe Leonessa.

Club career 
Kikuchi made her WE League debut on 12 September 2021.

References 

Living people
2001 births
Japanese women's footballers
Association football people from Miyazaki Prefecture
Women's association football midfielders
INAC Kobe Leonessa players
WE League players